Sokolniki Exhibition and Convention Centre is one of Moscow’s venues to host some exhibitions and conferences. It is located in East Administrative District directly in Sokolniki Park for Leisure and Recreation. It is one of the oldest exhibition sites and the first to start exhibition industry in Russia.

History 

The first exhibition to be held in Sokolniki took place in 1959. The American National Exhibition was the first international event to demonstrate some foreign achievements in the USSR. Nikita Khrushchev and the US Vice President Richard Nixon officially opened the exhibition. That’s when pavilion no. 2 witnessed the legendary “kitchen debate” between Nixon and Khrushchev at the General Electric Company’s booth. During the so-called “kitchen debate” America and the Soviet Union verbally jousted over which system was superior – communism or capitalism. Since then, exhibitions received a permanent residence in Sokolniki.

The first exhibition pavilion highlighted the event. It was a round dome construction invented by American architect and engineer Richard Fuller. Thus Sokolniki began its active exhibition life that is still progressing. We may say that the history of the USSR exhibition activities in its modern interpretation began right in Sokolniki.

Construction of new exhibition pavilions in Sokolniki Park started in 1960s.  Those were light single-floor buildings with a steel framework. During the first years the exhibitions were held only in summer because the buildings were not heated. The “Interorgtekhnika” international exhibition of 1966 was hosted in 20 exhibition halls occupying an area of 50 000 sq. m. The exhibition halls were mounted in various areas of the park depending on the requirements of a given project. In the years of prosperity Sokolniki had 22 exhibit halls. The biggest total exhibition area of 65 000 sq. m (indoor and outdoor) was occupied by the exhibition “Chemistry-70”.  For many years Sokolniki has been the only international exhibition site in the Soviet Union.

56 national and international expositions were exhibited in Sokolniki in 1959-1976. The largest events displayed printing, chemical, engineering and machine-building, automobile and geodesic industries’ production. That time 19,000 million people visited the exhibition pavilions. The American National Exhibition (1959) attracted over one million visitors and the French National Exhibition (1961) was visited by about 1.8 million people. The same interest was attracted by specialized industrial exhibitions. For example, the exhibition "Chemistry-1965" was visited by 1.5 million people. The collections of all these exhibitions were placed among others in the two exhibition halls left by the Americans after their exhibition in 1959.

Since 1977, Sokolniki has been suffering the period of exhibition “stagnation” that ended only in late 1980s. In 1989, the German company “Glahe International” and the Moscow Fair Company (Moskau Messe) joined. Since that time Moskau Messe Exhibition Company has been carrying out its activities in Sokolniki Exhibition and Convention Centre. Thus, exhibition activity returned to Sokolniki.

In 2009-2010 the Centre was reconstructed and renovated. The old pavilions were repaired and two new ones — a two-storey pavilion 7A and pavilion 4 — were constructed.

In 2011, Sokolniki Exhibition and Convention Centre became a full member of the Russian Union of Exhibitions and Fairs, the Global Association of Exhibition Industry (UFI) and the International Association of Congress Centres (AIPC).

In 2011 close interaction was established between Sokolniki Exhibition and Convention Centre and Sokolniki Park for Leisure and Recreation. A new development strategy to be evolved.

Sokolniki Exhibition and Convention Centre today 

Nowadays, Sokolniki Exhibition and Convention Centre complex features 10 pavilions. Annually Sokolniki Exhibition and Convention Centre host more than 200 specialized exhibition and convention events, as well as social projects.

Sokolniki Exhibition and Convention Centre has tight business relations with Moskau Messe Exhibition Company. Today, Moskau Messe organizes about 10 exhibition projects including Equiros (International Equestrian Exhibition), The Russian Education Forum, WAN Expo (Festival of pregnant women) and some others.

Contemporary Museum of Calligraphy opened in Sokolniki is the only museum in Russia dedicated to the art of fancy writing. The National School of Calligraphy works at the Museum.

See also 
 Exhibition of Achievements of National Economy

References

External links 

International Exhibition of Calligraphy
Our Victory
Contemporary Museum of Calligraphy
The first handwritten Constitution of the Russian Federation

Trade fairs in Russia
Convention centers in Russia
Buildings and structures in Moscow